Anarkali Akarsha (born 12 July 1987,as Anarkali Janina Jayatilaka) is a Sri Lankan Film actress, model, singer, TV Host and a politician. She was crowned Miss Sri Lanka 2004 and represented Sri Lanka at the Miss World 2004 beauty pageant. She has worked as a brand ambassador & a fundraiser. She attended Colombo International School.

Film career
Her first public opportunity to act came when Somaratne Dissanayake and Renuka Balasuriya, who directed and produced the teledrama Iti Pahan in 1995, were in search of a little girl who was fluent in English. In the drama, she performed the role of "Daisy Susan" beside renowned actress Vasanthi Chathurani.

After a nearly seven-year hiatus, she returned to acting in 2003 when, at 15, she was cast in a lead role in Pissu Trible. Subsequently, she performed in several successful movies, and received acclaim in teledrama performances with her roles as "Inoka" in Sihinayak Paata Paatin and 'Tanya' in Santhuwaranaya.

She is the youngest actress to date in the history of Sri Lankan Cinema to win the most popular actress award. She has acted as the leading lady in more than 22 movies and 10 teledramas. She also works as a model, brand ambassador and a presenter.

She has appeared in many music videos. Some of her famous music videos are  "Meedum selen" by Bathiya and Santhush, "Jeththu none" by Dushanth Weeraman and "Siththamak wage" by Yashan.

Anarkalli also won the glamorous Lux Derana Film Most Popular Actress Award for 2012.

Political career
Anarkalli contested for the Galle District at the 2009 Southern Provincial Council Election, and on 29 October 2009, she was elected to the Southern Province Council. She is the youngest female councillor to date, and the sole female member on the council.

Career as a host

Anarkalli hosted her own TV show 'Anarkali Live' on TV Derana.
She also hosted Derana Music Awards 2010. She hosted her own talk show, LIVE Sunday with Anarkalli on Swarnavahini.

Filmography

Teledramas

References

External links 
Official website
Anarkalli Aakarsha's Biography in Sinhala Cinema Database

Sri Lankan television actresses
Sri Lankan film actresses
Sri Lankan female models
1987 births
Living people
Miss World 2004 delegates
Members of the Southern Provincial Council
Sri Lankan beauty pageant winners
Alumni of Colombo International School
Sinhalese politicians
20th-century Sri Lankan actresses